The Women's Allam British Open 2014 is the women's edition of the 2014 British Open Squash Championships, which is a WSA World Series event Platinum (Prize money: $100 000). The event took place at the Sports Arena in Hull in England from 12 May to 18 May. Nicol David won her fifth British Open trophy, beating Laura Massaro in the final.

Prize money and ranking points
For 2014, the prize purse was $100,000. The prize money and points breakdown is as follows:

Seeds

Draw and results

See also
WSA World Series 2014
2014 Men's British Open

References

External links
WISPA British Open 2013 website
British Open 2013 official website

Women's British Open Squash Championships
Women's British Open
Women's British Open Squash Championship
Squash in England
2010s in Kingston upon Hull
Sport in Kingston upon Hull
2014 in women's squash